Looty is a 2001 Indian Tamil-language comedy film directed by Parameswar. The film stars Sathyaraj in triple roles, Roja and Mumtaj. The film, produced by V. A. Durai, was released on 14 January 2001 to mixed reviews.

Plot

Rasappa (Sathyaraj) and Vellaiappa (Vadivelu) were mechanics and good friends. They grew older so they were determined to get married as soon as possible. Vellaiappa was in love with Sona (Kalpana). Geetha (Roja) left her home after her step-mother's pressures. Geetha was accidentally kidnapped by Rasappa who thought that she was Sona and Rasappa fell in love subsequently with Geetha. Vellaiappa married his lover Sona while Rasappa married Geetha.

After a few years, Rasappa became a rich businessman but the couple didn't have children, whereas his friend Vellaiappa and Sona had two children. The doctor revealed that Geetha was unable to become a mother. Then suddenly one day, Rasappa found an abandoned baby in his car. After much hesitation, the couple adopted the baby. However, Geeta began to suspect Rasappa for being Jeeva's real father.

After finishing his study overseas, Jeeva is back and he shocks everybody when he arrives, Jeeva and Rasappa are looking alike, sending Geetha into a fit of fury, all her suspicions confirmed, despite Rasappa's bewilderment and protests of innocence, while Jeeva begins to flirt with Gayatri (Mumtaj) and they both end in love. Finally the culprit is revealed. It is Rasappa's father, a lecherous old man in the village almost on his deathbed, who couldn't keep his hands off a nurse assigned to him. The result being a little stepbrother for Rasappa. And the man who put the baby in the couple's car was Kuzhanthavelu, the family doctor, who was in the know of things. But his good intentions had backfired. But then it's all well that ends well.

Cast

Sathyaraj as Rasappa, Jeeva and English Kuppan (triple roles)
Roja as Geetha, Rasappa's wife
Mumtaj as Gayathri, Jeeva's love interest
Vadivelu as Vellaiappa, Rasappa's friend
Vivek as Thiyagarajan, Geetha's stepbrother
Kalpana as Sona, Vellaiappa's wife
Visu as Dr. Kuzhanthavelu
Pandu as Subramanian, an advocate
Ponnambalam as Thiyagarajan's henchman
Madhan Bob
LIC Narasimhan
Kullamani
Mayilsamy as Jeeva's friend
Bayilvan Ranganathan

Soundtrack

The film score and the soundtrack were composed by Deva. The soundtrack, released in 2001, features 5 tracks with lyrics written by Kavi Markandeyar and Vaali.

Reception
The Hindu wrote "despite a hackneyed script and clichéd plot twists, the film is entertaining because it maintains a light tone throughout. At no point does it become over-dramatic and that, one must add, is a saving grace!". BBthots wrote "with a ridiculously silly story and cheap comedy, all it does is erase any gains Satyaraj may have made with Ennammaa Kannu". Chennai Online wrote "the film turns out to be a damp squib, with a meandering screenplay, inept handling, time factor that goes hay wire, and comedy that tries out your patience".From this film actress Mumtaj became so popular after portraying her glamorous role in a full-length linear movie

References

2001 films
Indian comedy films
Films scored by Deva (composer)
2000s Tamil-language films